Charles Richard Dierkop (born September 11, 1936) is an American character actor. He is most recognized for his supporting roles in the films Butch Cassidy and the Sundance Kid (1969) and The Sting (1973) and the television series Police Woman (1974-1978).

Early years
Dierkop was born in La Crosse, Wisconsin, and attended Aquinas High School in La Crosse. He was raised by his aunt and uncle after his father left when Dierkop was an infant and his mother "left home when he was still a tot".

Military service
Dierkop dropped out of high school after his junior year and enlisted in the U.S. Marines. He served in Korea after the Korean War had ended and returned from there when he was discharged at age 19. Upon his return, he lived with his mother in Philadelphia, and with the help of the G.I. Bill, he enrolled in the American Foundation of Dramatic Arts in Philadelphia.

Career
Dierkop is a lifetime member of the Actors Studio. His first role as a professional actor was in television's Naked City.

He was cast in two George Roy Hill films, and played an outlaw both times — as "Flat Nose Curry" in Butch Cassidy and the Sundance Kid (1969), he played a member of the Hole in the Wall Gang, and as "Floyd" in The Sting (1973), he acted as a bodyguard with Lee Paul to Robert Shaw's New York gangster/griftee, Doyle Lonnegan. He is best known for playing Detective Pete Royster on the television series Police Woman between 1974 and 1978.

Dierkop appears briefly in the music video of "Man on the Moon", a hit song by the American alternative rock band R.E.M.

Personal life
Dierkop was married to Joan Addis from 1958 to 1974. They have a daughter and a son.

Partial filmography
 1961 Voyage to the Bottom of the Sea as Pilot of The Seaview (uncredited)
 1961 The Hustler as Pool Room Hood (uncredited)
 1964 The Pawnbroker as Robinson
 1967 Gunn as Lazlo Joyce
 1967 The St. Valentine's Day Massacre as Salvanti
 1968 The Sweet Ride as Mr. Clean
 1969 The Thousand Plane Raid as Railla
 1969 Butch Cassidy and the Sundance Kid as George "Flat-Nose" Curry
 1970 Pound as Airdale
 1971 Angels Hard as They Come as General
 1972 Night of the Cobra Woman as (uncredited)
 1972 The Hot Box as Garcia, The Journalist / Major Dubay
 1973 Messiah of Evil as The Gas Attendant
 1973 The Student Teachers as (uncredited)
 1973 The Sting as Floyd
 1977 Captains Courageous as Tom Platt
 1979 Star Virgin as Igor 
 1981 Texas Lightning as Walt
 1984 Silent Night, Deadly Night as The Killer Santa
 1985 The Fix as Hawkeye
 1987 Savage Harbor as Boat Gunman
 1987 Code Name Zebra as "Crazy"
 1987 Banzai Runner as Traven
 1988 Grotesque as Matson
 1988 Messenger of Death as Orville Beecham
 1989 Spies and Lovers as Ben "Biker Ben"
 1989 Blood Red as Cooper
 1989 Liberty & Bash as "Mr. B"
 1990 Eternity as The Video Editor
 1990 Nerds of a Feather Ben "Biker Ben"
 1990 Under Crystal Lake
 1992 Roots of Evil as Collins
 1994 Maverick as Riverboat Poker Player (uncredited)
 1994 Reverse Heaven as Bank Robber
 1996 Too Fast Too Young as Businessman
 1998 Merchants of Venus as Carl
 1998 Invisible Dad as Mr. Weiderman
 2000 Superguy: Behind the Cape as Sam Trent
 2005 Murder on the Yellow Brick Road as Redwood
 2006 Mystery Woman: Wild West Mystery (TV movie) as Zeke Foster
 2008 Chinaman's Chance: America's Other Slaves as Dr. Sawyer
 2009 Forget Me Not as Pete, The Foreman
 2016 The Midnighters as Louie

Television credits

The Naked City (1960-1962) - Arrest Suspect / Boy who Gets Beaten Up / Tow Truck Driver / Shag's Friend / Hungarian in Rail Yard / Hood / Registered Mail Clerk / Hood #1 (uncredited)
Voyage to the Bottom of the Sea (1965) - Left-Handed Man
Lost in Space (1965) - Horned Mutant (uncredited)
The Man from U.N.C.L.E. (1966) - Adolph
Gunsmoke (1966) - Silvee
The Andy Griffith Show (1966) - Larry
Star Trek (1967, episode: Wolf in the Fold) - Morla
Batman (1968) - Dustbag (uncredited)
Adam-12 (1968) - Janney
Lancer (1968-1970) - Walters / Bleaker / Harris
Bonanza (1969-1972) - Shorty / Nicholson / Sawyer
The High Chaparral (1970) - Slim
Land of the Giants (1970) - Arthur Kamber
Bearcats! (1971, in episode 9, "Bitter Flats") - Pistolero
Love, American Style (1971) - Gus (segment "Love and the Eyewitness")
Mission: Impossible (1972) - Richie
Alias Smith and Jones (1971-1973) - Clayton Crewes / Poker Player / Shields
Kung Fu (1973) - Traphagen
Mannix (1969-1973) - Frank / Makuta / John Marrish
Gunsmoke (1966-1973) - Traphagen
Kojak (1974) - DeLuca
Police Story (1973-1974) - Royster / Dave Rawlins
Cannon (1971-1974) - Eddie Main / Keegan
Police Woman (1974-1978) - Det. Pete Royster 
Vega$ (1978) - Lenny
The Deerslayer (1978, TV Movie) - Hurry Harry March
CHiPs (1980) - Mouse
Fantasy Island (1980-1982) - Vinnie Avalon / Harry 'Weasel' Forbes
Matt Houston (1983-1984) - Viney / Choo Choo
The Fall Guy (1983-1985) - Mack Doyle / Arden
Simon & Simon (1986-1988) - Al Pacheco / Jerry Sappman
MacGyver (1991) - Mo Nimitz

Further reading 
Aquinas News, Aquinas High School, La Crosse, Wisconsin, September 18, 1975, vol. 45, no. 2, pg. 1, "Former Aquinite is TV Star"
Aquinas News, Aquinas High School, La Crosse, Wisconsin, September 2, 1978, Special 50th Anniversary edition, pg. 12, "Former Aquinite has his name in lights", Sue Schmidt, class of 1978.

References

External links
 
 

1936 births
Living people
Actors Studio alumni
American male film actors
American male television actors
Aquinas High School (La Crosse, Wisconsin) alumni
Male actors from Wisconsin
Military personnel from Wisconsin
People from La Crosse, Wisconsin
20th-century American male actors